Jobe Samuel Patrick Bellingham (born 23 September 2005) is an English professional footballer who plays as a midfielder or forward for  club Birmingham City. He has represented England at under-17 and U18 levels.

Early and personal life
Jobe Bellingham was born in Stourbridge, West Midlands, on 23 September 2005, the younger son of Denise and Mark Bellingham. Mark works as a sergeant in the West Midlands Police and was a prolific goalscorer in non-League football. Bellingham is the younger brother of England international footballer Jude Bellingham, who preceded him into Birmingham City's academy where both were to spend their formative years. The 16-year-old Jude was a first-team regular during the 2019–20 season before signing for German club Borussia Dortmund. After Jude's departure, Jobe featured in Birmingham's 2020–21 season kit unveiling.

Club career
He remained unused, as he did in the second round of the same competition. Had he made a debut in either match, still a few weeks short of his 16th birthday, he would have become the club's youngest ever first-team player, breaking the record set by his brother in the first round two years earlier. Later that year, rumours linked Jude Bellingham with a return to England; counter-rumours linked Jude's club, Borussia Dortmund, with interest in signing Jobe. By the end of the year he had four goals from nine appearances for Birmingham's under-18 team in their section of the Under-18 Premier League, and had played four times for their under-23s in Premier League 2 Division 2.

Bellingham was named on the bench for the EFL Championship match against Coventry City in November. Manager Lee Bowyer insisted that observers should not judge him by his brother's achievements, pointing out that he was "next in line" because of the number of injuries among the club's midfielders. He again remained unused. He made his senior debut as a second-half substitute in Birmingham's 2021–22 FA Cup third-round match at home to League One club Plymouth Argyle, replacing the 17-year-old Jordan James after 70 minutes with the score goalless and Birmingham reduced to ten men. At 16 years, 107 days, he became Birmingham's second youngest debutant. After the match, which Birmingham lost 1–0, Bowyer said he had earned his debut by the improvement in his game over the previous few weeks training with the first team. He made his first appearance in the Football League a week later as a late substitute in a 1–1 draw away to Preston North End. His next was not until the final match of the season.

In July 2022, Birmingham confirmed that Bellingham would be taking up a scholarship with the club and had agreed terms on a first professional contract, to take effect on his 17th birthday.

International career
Bellingham was born in England, and is reported to be also eligible to represent Ireland via a paternal grandparent. He made his debut for England under-16s on 3 June 2021, starting a 6–0 friendly win against Northern Ireland. He made his first appearance at under-17 level three months later in the Syrenka Cup tournament against Romania; he marked the occasion by missing a penalty, but England still won 2–0. He also played in the other group match and in the final, which England lost 3–2 to the Netherlands. In October, he played in all three of England's 2022 European Under-17 Championship qualifying round matches, and provided an assist for Kobbie Mainoo's goal in a 7–0 win against Armenia, as England topped their group and progressed to the elite round.

After eight appearances for the under-17s, Bellingham was included in the England under-18 squad for a four-team mini-tournament at the Pinatar Arena in Spain in September 2022. He started against the  Netherlands and Belgium and was a late substitute against the Faroe Islands as England won all three matches.

Career statistics

References

2005 births
Living people
Sportspeople from Stourbridge
Footballers from the West Midlands (county)
English footballers
England youth international footballers
Association football forwards
Association football midfielders
Birmingham City F.C. players
English Football League players
Black British sportsmen
English people of Irish descent